Mirzaabad (also Romanized as Mīrzāābād; also known as Mīrzāābād-e ‘Olyā) is a village in Mirbag-e Jonubi Rural District, in the Central District of Delfan County, Lorestan Province, Iran. At the 2006 census, its population was 836, in 172 families.

References 

Towns and villages in Delfan County